Carol Zardetto is a Guatemalan novelist, lawyer, scriptwriter and diplomat, and is part of the generation of Guatemalan writers who grew up under the shadow of Guatemalan Civil War.

Biography 

She was born in Guatemala City, and has a degree in law. She was co-author of the theatre criticism column "Butaca de dos" (Seat for two; "Magazine XX", Siglo Veintiuno, 1994-1996). She published the novel "Con pasión absoluta" (With absolute passion) in 2007; it was awarded the Mario Monteforte Toledo prize in 2004.

She was Guatemala's deputy minister of education in 1996, and from 1997 to 2000 she was consul general of Guatemala in Vancouver, Canada.,

References

External links

 Entrevista a Carol Zardetto, Letralia, 18 August 2008.

Year of birth missing (living people)
Living people
Guatemalan novelists
Guatemalan diplomats
Women novelists
Guatemalan women columnists
People from Guatemala City
20th-century Guatemalan women writers
21st-century novelists
21st-century Guatemalan women writers
Women screenwriters
Education ministers
Guatemalan women diplomats
Government ministers of Guatemala
Women government ministers of Guatemala
20th-century Guatemalan women politicians
20th-century Guatemalan politicians
21st-century Guatemalan women politicians
21st-century Guatemalan politicians